Caju may refer to:

 Caju, a river of Roraima state in northern Brazil
 Caju, a lower-class district of the Zona Norte (North Zone) of Rio de Janeiro
 Caju, the Portuguese name for the fruit of the Cashew tree
 Caju Cemetery, a necropolis in Rio de Janeiro

People 
 Caju (footballer, born 1915)
 Caju (footballer, born 1949), Brazilian retired football attacking midfielder
 Caju (footballer, born 1995), Brazilian football leftback

Other uses 
 Samba Cajú, a town and municipality in Cuanza Norte Province in Angola
 , a trans-Neptunian object nicknamed Caju

See also 
 Cajun (disambiguation)